Joseph G. Echols Memorial Hall is a 4,500-seat multi-purpose arena in Norfolk, Virginia, located to the northeast of Dick Price Stadium on the eastern edge of Norfolk State University. It was built in 1982 to replace Gill Gymnasium as home to the Norfolk State Spartans men's and women's basketball and women's volleyball teams, as well as housing athletics offices and hosting the school's ROTC program. The seating bowl is divided into four sides, with three divided levels of seating colored green and gold, the school's colors. The hall is named for Joseph G. Echols, who is credited by the university as the person most responsible for the expansion of the school's athletics department to its current extents. It hosted the 1997 MEAC men's basketball tournament.

See also
 List of NCAA Division I basketball arenas

References

External links
 Joseph Echols Hall at NSU website
 Joseph G. Echols Memorial Hall at NSUSpartans.com

College basketball venues in the United States
Indoor arenas in Virginia
Basketball venues in Virginia
Sports venues in Norfolk, Virginia
Norfolk State Spartans men's basketball
Sports venues completed in 1982
1982 establishments in Virginia
College volleyball venues in the United States